John Guth (born June 21, 1981) is a professional poker player from Vancouver, Washington who won a bracelet at the World Championship Limit Omaha-8 event at the 2007 World Series of Poker.

Guth plays online under the handle "Sirscoopsalot." He's also the activities director at Camp Scoopy.

As of 2007, his total live tournament winnings exceed $380,000.

Notes

External links
PokerListings.com biography - John Guth

1981 births
Living people
American poker players
World Series of Poker bracelet winners
Sportspeople from Vancouver, Washington